Servoy is a development and deployment platform for enterprise applications, written itself in Java, and which uses JavaScript as its scripting language. It can adopt the native look and feel of any platform or the web, using HTML5 and CSS code. Servoy was created from the start to make enterprise business application development easy. It has introduced many innovations for that purpose: the use of JavaScript instead of Java, a comprehensive development framework with building blocks that are added through drag and drop, a web client, etc.

Servoy was inspired by 4GLs in terms of how applications are developed but unlike many 4GLs, it does not use proprietary languages and/or databases, being based instead on open standards. Servoy consists of a GUI designer, is event-driven and runs scripts through JavaScript. Servoy allows applications to be deployed on a native Smart client (Rich client) and on a pure HTML Web client from the same codebase and user interface forms.

Servoy offers a free community edition for non-commercial use, which can be downloaded from the company's website.

Servoy applications can be deployed on all popular operating systems including Microsoft Windows, macOS, Linux, Solaris and other UNIX systems. eWeek and MacUser Magazine gave Servoy a 4 mouse rating.

Applications developed with Servoy can access data from all popular SQL back-ends such as PostgreSQL, Oracle, Microsoft SQL Server, IBM Db2, IBM Informix, Sybase,  MySQL and Firebird, and combine data from different databases into a single user interface.

The Servoy suite of products consists of: 
 The Servoy Developer and ServoyCloud, used to build applications by creating user interface forms and connecting their elements to JavaScript code. This is done within the Eclipse IDE (integrated development environment.)
 The Servoy Application Server, used to deploy the application and to communicate with a connected database
 The Servoy NG (browser), Desktop and Mobile Client which run on the end user's device (workstations, computers, tablets or smartphones)
Servoy also offers a runtime version that allows the creation of standalone Servoy applications.

The Servoy Application Server includes the Servoy Headless Client. This client allows other applications to execute Servoy business rules including using them as a web service. The headless client also allows batch processing and scheduled tasks.

Servoy has a partnering network of about 200 companies—the Servoy Alliance Network (SAN)—that offer Servoy development, Servoy components (Beans and plugins), consulting or hosting services.

History of Servoy
Servoy is the brainchild of Jan Aleman and Jan Blok, who met while studying computer science. Application development was hard and they wanted to change that. The cofounders started development in 1997 and recruited a few earlier adopters as clients. Servoy, B.V. was established in 2001 in the Netherlands to commercialize the new product. Two years later, Servoy, Inc. opened in the United States, currently locating in Westlake Village, Los Angeles, California. In 2006, sales started to grow exponentially. Having outgrown its initial 4GL replacement roots, Servoy started to serve ISVs (Independent Software Vendors). It soon became a tool for ISVs to quickly rewrite for the Internet with full Web 2.0 functionality (RIA, AJAX, data broadcasting, etc.)

Servoy 4.0 was released during the summer of 2006 with a move from Servoy's proprietary-based IDE to Eclipse. Tech analysts and tech journalists took great interest in the Servoy 4.0 release, resulting in a slew of articles and mentions (see below). Since Servoy 5, the developer and client code has been available under both an AGPL and commercial license. In 2022 Servoy introduced the Titanium edition, a major upgrade from the NG Client. 

The company hosts an annual developer conference called ServoyWorld, where new versions are introduced, an overview of the current product roadmap is provided,  and expert reports about advanced development topics are presented.

References

External links 

Servoy

Integrated development environments
Eclipse (software)
Classic Mac OS software
MacOS programming tools
Programming tools for Windows
Software using the GNU AGPL license